The 100th United States Congress began on January 3, 1987. There were 12 new senators (ten Democrats, two Republicans) and 50 new representatives (27 Democrats, 23 Republicans) at the start of the first session. Additionally, one senator (a Republican) and eight representatives (five Democrats, three Republicans) took office on various dates in order to fill vacancies during the 100th Congress before it ended on January 3, 1989.

Senate

Took office January 3, 1987

Took office during the 100th Congress

House of Representatives

Took office January 3, 1987

Took office during the 100th Congress

See also 
 List of United States senators in the 100th Congress
 List of members of the United States House of Representatives in the 100th Congress by seniority

Notes

References 

100th United States Congress
100